Kathleen Dunlea (referred as Delea in newspaper cuttings from the time) is a former camogie player, captain of the All Ireland Camogie Championship winning team in 1934, scoring two goals in Cork's 4-3 to 1–4 victory over Louth.

References

External links
 Camogie.ie Official Camogie Association Website

Cork camogie players
Year of birth missing
Possibly living people